Albert Galiyevich Nasibulin (born 23 March 1972 in Novokuznetsk city, Kemerovo Region, USSR) is a Russian material scientist recognized for the contributions to synthesis of nanoparticles and carbon nanotubes. Presently he occupies the full professor position at Skolkovo Institute of Science and Technology (Moscow, Russia). He is an author of over 350 scientific publications; his H-index is 61 (as of February 2023). He bears the title of a Professor of the Russian Academy of Sciences. A leading academic platform Research.com included Nasibulin among the top material science researchers (#3161 in global ranking, #4 in national).

Career 
Nasibulin graduated from the Chemical Department of Kemerovo State University (KemSU, Russia) in 1994. He earned the degrees of Candidate of chemical sciences (1996, KemSU) and Doktor nauk in technical sciences (2011, St.-Petersburg State Technical University, Russia).

From 1999 to 2014, he worked in Finland: until 2002 he was a senior researcher at the VTT Technical Research Centre of Finland, and since 2003 a senior scientist, docent and adjunct professor at the Department of Applied Physics of Helsinki University of Technology (current name: Aalto University). In 2006-2011, he received an Academy Fellow position from the Academy of Finland.

In 2014, Nasibulin returned to Russia and joined the Skolkovo Institute of Science and Technology (Skoltech). Now he is a professor at the Center for Photonic Science and Engineering of the Skoltech and a head of the Laboratory of Nanomaterials. Until 2022, he held an adjunct professorship at Aalto University.

Research activities 
Nasibulin specialises on synthesis of nanomaterials (carbon nanotubes, nanoparticles and nanowires), investigation of their growth mechanisms and applications. He is known for the original aerosol CVD methods of the synthesis of multi-walled and single-walled CNTs. Nasibulin developed a dry transfer technique to prepare conductive, flexible and transparent coating for ITO replacement and freestanding single-walled CNT films to fabricate the state-of-the-art key components for several high-impact application areas. He proposed a method for rapid and controlled synthesis of metal oxide nanowires.

In the field of nanotechnologies, he co-authorized more than 300 peer-reviewed papers many of which appeared in Nature Nanotechnology, Nature Communications, ACS Nano, Nano Letters, Angewandte Chemie and other media of comparable level. Also, he got about 40 patents.

Nasibulin is a co-founder of three companies: Canatu Ltd. (spin-off from Helsinki University of Technology) and CryptoChemistry and Novaprint (spin-offs from Skoltech). He chaired several conferences  and served as expert or reviewer for various journals and national/international scientific programs.

Awards 
 2010:  FAAR (Finnish Association for Aerosol Research) award for Excellent work in Aerosol Science at International Aerosol Conference in Helsinki, Finland.
 2011: Smoluchowski award for the contribution to field of "Aerosol synthesis and mechanistic investigations of carbon nanotubes" at European Aerosol Conference in Manchester, UK.
 2017, 2019, 2020, 2021, 2022: The Best Professor of SkolTech in various nominations.  
 2018: Honorary title of the Professor of the Russian Academy of Sciences.
 2019: Gold medal named after academician I. V. Petryanov for outstanding achievements in the field of physical and applied chemistry.

References 

Living people
1972 births
Russian physicists
Russian chemists
Russian materials scientists
Kemerovo State University alumni
Peter the Great St. Petersburg Polytechnic University alumni
Academic staff of Aalto University
People from Novokuznetsk